Stoic Bliss (SB) is a Bangladeshi-American hip hop band. It consists of hip hop artists Kazzurg (Kazi), Ac1d, Lit Slick, Silma, and Shak1r.

History
Stoic Bliss began their work when they met native producers AQ finest and DJ DEPIC, who produced most of their early tracks. Their group was the very first to introduce hip-hop to Bangladesh through blogs before social media existed quickly gaining popularity in the underground music scene in Bangladesh. They paved the way for similar up and coming Bengali rap artists to take stand and created a platform where other artists can share their music and passion for hip-hop music. After their first album due to lack of exposure and internal group controversies Xtro, B1shop, Tizzy, Rul, Mana and Fly left the band.

The band's debut album Lights Years Ahead (আলোক বর্ষ দূরে) was released in Bangladesh in June 2006. This album featured early Stoic Bliss members: Kazi, Ac1d, Xtro, B1shop, Tizzy, Montana, Rul and Fly.

The single Abar Jigay raised the group's popularity among Bengali speakers. Light Years Ahead sold well over 250,000 copies within the first 10 months making Stoic Bliss an emerging mainstream music group in Bangladesh. Other songs like Mayabi Chokh, Shesh Barer Moto, Chow Mei Fun were also popular among listeners. This album featured early Stoic Bliss members Xtro, B1shop, Tizzy Montana, Rul, Fly and Mana. Abar Jigay was used in popular media nationwide in Bangladesh and still played in every house until this day.

Stoic bliss released their second album Kolponar Baire (Beyond the Imagination) in the middle of the 2007 where Kazi took on the role as the lead singer and Ac1d as the lead rapper forming the ultimate duo. The album featured songs like Raatri Jaga, Ei Je Ami, Shomoyer Palki and the recreation of their first hit called Abar Abar Jigay which quickly regained their popularity as the Fathers Of Bangla Hip-Hop. It also featured songs by Ac1d like Ac1d Ke , Amar Bondhu Bonduk, Pura Ura Dhura and Fire Like A Dragon which quickly gained over 500,000 views on YouTube. His popularity skyrocketed as the fastest rapper in the world to be able to tongue twist both in English and Bengali.

After their second album they were gone from the music scene for a while due to disputes with the record label that owned their publishing and lack of brand sponsorship. Ac1d decided to venture into the American music industry where he released several mixtapes and music video which also took popularity on YouTube. Their original music however still continued to stream to millions of fans who recognized them for their accomplishments with the first two albums they released and continued to support them as the creators of Bangla rap.

Stoic Bliss unexpectedly returned to the music scene in 2017 with two new addition to their group Lit Slick and Silma. With the help and sponsorship from their childhood friend and also the Stoic Bliss manager Sanjin Rana they began to release singles from their long awaited upcoming album Stoic Bliss 3 which put them back on the map as listeners worldwide flocked to their new music.

In 2021, despite the pandemic they continued to release new content with their newest producer Shak1r and also continue to release high quality music videos on YouTube. They now have a solid fan base of millions of Bengali listeners who are still dancing to their catchy tunes and patiently waiting for an official release date for their long anticipated third album. Stoic Bliss told us they plan on taking over the Bengali music industry internationally once again the 'right way' with their new team in place. There are rumors that Stoic Bliss 3 album will be released from a Major Record Label in the coming months.

Discography 

Studio albums
 Light Years Ahead (2006)
 Kolponar Baire (2007)
 Bangali Bangali (2022)

References

Musical groups established in 2004
Bangladeshi hip hop groups
G-Series (record label) artists